The A2 is a Belgian motorway that coincides completely with the Belgian part of the European route E314. It starts in Leuven, at the junction with the A3/E40 in the province of Flemish Brabant. Then it goes through the province of Limburg, where it crosses the A13/E313 in Lummen. It ends at the Dutch border, where it became the Dutch A76.

Pictures

External links
 

Motorways in Belgium